Polarizability usually refers to the tendency of matter, when subjected to an electric field, to acquire an electric dipole moment in proportion to that applied field. It is a property of all matter, considering that matter is made up of elementary particles which have an electric charge, namely protons and electrons. When subject to an electric field, the negatively charged electrons and positively charged atomic nuclei are subject to opposite forces and undergo charge separation. Polarizability is responsible for a material's dielectric constant and, at high (optical) frequencies, its refractive index.

The polarizability of an atom or molecule is defined as the ratio of its induced dipole moment to the local electric field; in a crystalline solid, one considers the dipole moment per unit cell. Note that the local electric field seen by a molecule is generally different from the macroscopic electric field that would be measured externally. This discrepancy is taken into account by the Clausius–Mossotti relation  (below) which connects the bulk behaviour (polarization density due to an external electric field according to the electric susceptibility ) with the molecular polarizability  due to the local field.

Magnetic polarizability likewise refers to the tendency for a magnetic dipole moment to appear in proportion to an external magnetic field. Electric and magnetic polarizabilities determine the dynamical response of a bound system (such as a molecule or crystal) to external fields, and provide insight into a molecule's internal structure. "Polarizability" should not be confused with the intrinsic magnetic or electric dipole moment of an atom, molecule, or bulk substance; these do not depend on the presence of an external field.

Electric polarizability

Definition

Electric polarizability is the relative tendency of a charge distribution, like the electron cloud of an atom or molecule, to be distorted from its normal shape by an external electric field.

The polarizability  in isotropic media is defined as the ratio of the induced dipole moment  of an atom to the electric field  that produces this dipole moment.

Polarizability has the SI units of C·m2·V−1 = A2·s4·kg−1 while its cgs unit is cm3. Usually it is expressed in cgs units as a so-called polarizability volume, sometimes expressed in Å3 = 10−24 cm3. One can convert from SI units to cgs units as follows:

 ≃ 8.988×1015 × 

where , the vacuum permittivity, is ~8.854 × 10−12 (F/m).

The polarizability of individual particles is related to the average electric susceptibility of the medium by the Clausius–Mossotti relation: 

Polarizability for anisotropic or non-spherical media cannot in general be represented as a scalar quantity. Many crystalline materials have directions that are easier to polarize than others and some even become polarized in directions perpendicular to the applied electric field, and the same thing happens with non-spherical bodies. Some molecules and materials with this sort of anisotropy are optically active, or exhibit linear birefringence of light.

Tensor
To describe anisotropic media a polarizability rank two tensor or  matrix  is defined,

so that:

The elements describing the response parallel to the applied electric field are those along the diagonal. A large value of  here means that an electric-field applied in the -direction would strongly polarize the material in the -direction. Explicit expressions for  have been given for homogeneous anisotropic ellipsoidal bodies.

Application in crystallography 
The matrix above can be used with the molar refractivity equation and other data to produce density data for crystallography. Each polarizability measurement along with the refractive index associated with its direction will yield a direction specific density that can be used to develop an accurate three dimensional assessment of molecular stacking in the crystal. This relationship was first observed by Linus Pauling.

Tendencies
Generally, polarizability increases as the volume occupied by electrons increases. In atoms, this occurs because larger atoms have more loosely held electrons in contrast to smaller atoms with tightly bound electrons. On rows of the periodic table, polarizability therefore decreases from left to right. Polarizability increases down on columns of the periodic table. Likewise, larger molecules are generally more polarizable than smaller ones.

Water is a very polar molecule, but alkanes and other hydrophobic molecules are more polarizable. Water with its permanent dipole is less likely to change shape due to an external electric field. Alkanes are the most polarizable molecules. Although alkenes and arenes are expected to have larger polarizability than alkanes because of their higher reactivity compared to alkanes, alkanes are in fact more polarizable. This results because of alkene's and arene's more electronegative sp2 carbons to the alkane's less electronegative sp3 carbons.

Ground state electron configuration models are often inadequate in studying the polarizability of bonds because dramatic changes in molecular structure occur in a reaction.

Magnetic polarizability
Magnetic polarizability defined by spin interactions of nucleons is an important parameter of deuterons and hadrons.  In particular, measurement of tensor polarizabilities of nucleons yields important information about spin-dependent nuclear forces.

The method of spin amplitudes uses quantum mechanics formalism to more easily describe spin dynamics.  Vector and tensor polarization of particle/nuclei with spin  are specified by the unit polarization vector  and the polarization tensor P`.  Additional tensors composed of products of three or more spin matrices are needed only for the exhaustive description of polarization of particles/nuclei with spin .

See also
 Dielectric
 Electric susceptibility
 Polarization density
 MOSCED, an estimation method for activity coefficients which uses polarizability as one of its parameters

References

Atomic physics
Chemical physics
Electric and magnetic fields in matter
Polarization (waves)